Hugh of Lusignan was a common name for French of the House of Lusignan.

People with the name
Hugh I (early 10th century)
Hugh II (died 967)
Hugh III
Hugh IV
Hugh V (died 1060)
Hugh VI (died 1110)
Hugh VII (died 1151)
Hugh VIII (died 1165)
Hugh IX (died 1219)
Hugh X (died 1249)
Hugh XI (died 1260)
Hugh XII (died btw. 1270–1282)
Hugh XIII (died 1303)
Hugh IX (died 1219)
Hugh X (died 1249)
Hugh XI (died 1260)
Hugh XII (died 1282)
Hugh XIII (died 1303)
Hugues Lancelot de Lusignan- A Greek Cardinal